Muilheh-ye Vosta (also Romanized as Mūīlḥeh-ye Vostá; also known as Molḩeh-ye Mīānī and Molḩeh-ye Vostá) is a village in Azadeh Rural District, Moshrageh District, Ramshir County, Khuzestan Province, Iran. At the 2006 census, its population was 55, in 12 families.

References 

Populated places in Ramshir County